Maria McErlane (born 9 December 1957, in Buckinghamshire, England) is a British actress and presenter specialising in comedy. She has been acting since 1984.  She has appeared in several TV series, including The Fast Show, Gimme Gimme Gimme, Thin Ice and Happiness, "straight" roles in The Bill and Holby City and as the narrator for Antoine de Caunes and Jean-Paul Gaultier's Eurotrash.

Career

Starting on the comedy circuit in the 1990s, under the name 'Maria Callous', she has also guested on shows such as Have I Got News for You, If I Ruled the World and Just a Minute on Radio 4. She also is part of the murder panel show Foul Play, alongside Lee Simpson.

In June 1984, she appeared in 'Out of Order' (a revue by Christopher Middleton and Jonathan Kydd) at the Finborough Theatre.

McErlane co-presented the ITV quiz show Carnal Knowledge with her friend Graham Norton in the mid 1990s. She co-presented the "Grill Graham" agony aunt feature with Norton on his BBC Radio 2 Saturday morning show throughout its run and on his departure for Virgin Radio UK in January 2021, joined him as co-presenter for his weekend shows. Whilst on Radio 2, she also stood in when he was ill in 2013 and when he failed to turn up on 28 June 2014. 

McErlane is a friend of Nigella Lawson and appeared on 16 episodes of Nigella Lawson's ITV chat show Nigella.

She has had regular columns in The Sunday Times Style and Esquire Magazine.

Personal life 

McErlane says she is a lapsed Catholic. She divides her time between Hastings and a London mews house.

Filmography

Television series 
Press Gang (1989–1990) as Maria, a waitress
Comedy Playhouse (1993) as Helen
Sean's Show (1993) as Teresa
This Life (1996) as Mrs Janet Webb
Jack and Jeremy's Real Lives (1996) as Twix Lady
Paul Merton in Galton & Simpson's (1997) as Jill
Gimme Gimme Gimme (1999) as Maureen
Bostock's Cup (1999) as Margaret Masson
Fat Friends (2000) as Brenda Falkinham
The Fast Show (1997 and 2000) Various roles
The Bill (2002) as Mrs. Walters
Happiness (2001–2003) as Shirley
Holby City (2004) as Martine Holbeck
Thin Ice (2006) as Nikki Sumner
Killing Eve (2020) as Diane

Films 
Children of Men (2006) as Shirley
It2i2 (2006) as Maria Leghorn

References

External links 

 BBC Comedy Guide

1957 births
English television actresses
English women comedians
Living people
Actresses from Buckinghamshire